Nama pusillum (also, Nama pusilla) is a species of flowering plant in the borage family known by the common name eggleaf fiddleleaf. It is native to the deserts of eastern California and Nevada and Arizona, where it grows in sandy and rocky habitat.

Nama pusillum is a hairy annual plant forming a small patch of prostrate stems no more than about 6 centimeters long. The fuzzy reddish or green leaves are up to a centimeter long and oval or lance-shaped, with winged petioles. The tiny funnel-shaped flowers are white to pale pink in color and have five-lobed faces just 1 or 2 millimeters wide.

External links
Nama pusilla. Jepson eFlora.
Nama pusilla. CalFlora.
Nama pusillum. USDA PLANTS.
Nama pusillum. CalPhotos.

pusillum
Flora of the California desert regions
Flora of the Sonoran Deserts
Flora of the Great Basin
Flora of Arizona
Flora of Nevada
Flora without expected TNC conservation status